The Richmond Rifles were a professional ice hockey team of the Eastern Hockey League from 1979–1981, playing in Richmond, Virginia at the Richmond Coliseum. They played the final two seasons of the EHL. They were the affiliates of the New York Rangers for both seasons and the Winnipeg Jets for 1980-81.

Season-by-season

See also 
Richmond Robins
Richmond Wildcats
Richmond Renegades
Richmond RiverDogs

References

External links 
EHL Statistics

Sports in Richmond, Virginia
Eastern Hockey League (1978–1981) teams
Ice hockey teams in Virginia
Defunct ice hockey teams in the United States
1979 establishments in Virginia
1981 disestablishments in Virginia
Ice hockey clubs established in 1979
Sports clubs disestablished in 1981
Winnipeg Jets minor league affiliates